Souleymane Koanda (born 21 September 1992) is a Burkinabé international footballer who plays as a defender.

Career
Koanda has played for ASFA Yennenga and Étoile Filante. In 2020 he played for Slutsk.

International
He made his international debut in 2015, and was named in the squad for the 2017 Africa Cup of Nations.

References

1994 births
Living people
Burkinabé footballers
Association football defenders
Burkina Faso international footballers
2017 Africa Cup of Nations players
Burkinabé expatriate footballers
Expatriate footballers in Belarus
Expatriate footballers in Ivory Coast
Expatriate footballers in Algeria
ASFA Yennenga players
Étoile Filante de Ouagadougou players
ASEC Mimosas players
JS Kabylie players
FC Slutsk players
Salitas FC players